Wang Chuzhi (王處直, Wade–Giles: Wang Chʻu-chih) (862–922), courtesy name Yunming (允明, Wade–Giles: Yün-ming), formally the Prince of Beiping (北平王, Wade–Giles: Prince of Pei-pʻing), was a warlord late in the Chinese Tang Dynasty and early in the subsequent Five Dynasties and Ten Kingdoms period, who ruled Yiwu Circuit (義武, headquartered in modern Baoding, Hebei) as its military governor (Jiedushi) from 900 (when his nephew Wang Gao, then military governor, fled under attack) and as its de jure sovereign from 910 (when he, along with his neighboring warlord Wang Rong the Prince of Zhao, broke away from Later Liang) to 921, when he was overthrown by his adoptive son Wang Du.

Background 
Wang Chuzhi was born in 862, during the reign of Emperor Yizong of Tang. His family was from the Tang Dynasty capital Chang'an, and his ancestors had served as officers in the imperial Shence Armies for generations. His father Wang Zong was not only a highly ranked general in the Shence Armies but was also a skillful merchant. It was said that Wang Zong became so rich that he was able to be extravagant in his food and to have thousands of servants.  He presumably followed his older brother Wang Chucun to Yiwu Circuit when Wang Chucun was made Yiwu's military governor in 879 by Emperor Yizong's son and successor Emperor Xizong and became a military officer there.

It was said that Wang Chuzhi favored sorcery, and he became friendly with the sorcerer Li Yingzhi.  Li Yingzhi himself had obtained a boy named Liu Yunlang from Xingyi (陘邑, in modern Shijiazhuang, Hebei) and adopted the boy as his own son, but seeing how Wang Chuzhi did not himself have son at that point, he gave the boy to Wang Chuzhi, stating, "this boy has a honored appearance."  Wang Chuzhi adopted the boy and changed his name to Wang Du.  While Wang Chuzhi later had a son named Wang Yu by a concubine (not his wife), he did not favor Wang Yu, and instead favored Wang Du.

By 900, Wang Chuzhi was serving as an officer under Wang Chucun's son and successor Wang Gao, when Yiwu came under the attack of Zhang Cunjing, a general under the major warlord Zhu Quanzhong the military governor of Xuanwu Circuit (宣武, headquartered in modern Kaifeng, Henan).  Wang Gao put Wang Chuzhi in command of the Yiwu army to resist Zhang's attack.  However, he did not listen to Wang Chuzhi's counsel of not engaging the Xuanwu forces immediately, but rather wearing out the Xuanwu forces before actually engaging them.  Rather, he listened to the secretary Liang Wen, who advocated an immediate engagement against the Xuanwu troops, and therefore ordered Wang Chuzhi to carry out that plan.  Zhang defeated Wang Chuzhi and inflicted heavy casualties.  Wang Chuzhi barely escaped back to Yiwu's capital Ding Prefecture.  Wang Gao panicked and fled to the territory of Yiwu's ally Li Keyong the military governor of Hedong Circuit (河東, headquartered in modern Taiyuan, Shanxi).  (Already upset over how his father did not love him, Wang Yu accompanied Wang Gong on this flight, and subsequently married Li Keyong's daughter.)  The Yiwu soldiers supported Wang Chuzhi to take over the circuit.  He subsequently negotiated a peace with Zhu, promising to submit to Zhu from this point on and no longer be allied with Li Keyong and also giving Zhu a tribute of silk.  Zhu thus withdrew, and at his request Wang Chuzhi was commissioned by then-reigning Emperor Zhaozong (Emperor Xizong's brother and successor) as the new military governor of Yiwu.

As military governor

During the Tang Dynasty 
In 901, Zhu Quanzhong launched a major five-pronged attack on Li Keyong, intending to finally capture Hedong's capital Taiyuan Municipality. As Zhu's ally, Wang Chuzhi commanded the Yiwu troops that served as one of the five prongs of the attack.  Zhu's and his allies's forces put Taiyuan under siege but were eventually forced to withdraw due to rains and illnesses. In 904, Emperor Zhaozong, who by that point was under Zhu's physical control, gave Wang the title of Taibao (太保, one of the Three Excellencies) and created him the Prince of Taiyuan.

After the Tang Dynasty 
In 907, Zhu Quanzhong had Emperor Zhaozong's son and successor Emperor Ai yield the throne to him, ending Tang Dynasty and starting a new Later Liang with him as its Emperor Taizu. Emperor Taizu bestowed the honorary chancellor title of Shizhong on Wang Chuzhi, and created him the Prince of Beiping.

After the establishment of the new dynasty, Wang Chuzhi's Yiwu Circuit and neighboring Wushun Circuit (武順, headquartered in modern Shijiazhuang, Hebei), which was governed by Wang Rong the Prince of Zhao, continued to, as they did during Tang Dynasty, refuse to submit taxes to the imperial government, but was often offering tributes to Emperor Taizu.  Despite this, however, Emperor Taizu believed that they would eventually turn against him, and therefore considered to forcibly seize them under direct control. In 910, he had his attendants Du Tingyin and Ding Yanhui forcibly seize Wushun's Shen and Ji (冀州, both in modern Hengshui, Hebei) by trick, and then prepared to have his general Wang Jingren attack Wushun's capital Zhen Prefecture.  In response, Wang Rong broke away from Later Liang (effectively become the ruler of an independent Zhao state while changing the name of his circuit from Wushun back to its Tang name of Chengde) and sought emergency aid from Li Keyong's son and successor Li Cunxu the Prince of Jin, as well as Liu Shouguang the military governor of Lulong Circuit (盧龍, headquartered in modern Beijing), who carried the title of Prince of Yan. Knowing that Yiwu would be the next target if Zhao fell, Wang Chuzhi also sent an emissary to Taiyuan, offering to support Li Cunxu as the common leader. Liu refused to render help, but Li Cunxu responded, first sending a detachment under his general Zhou Dewei and then leading the main Jin army himself to aid Wang Rong. During the subsequent campaign between combined Jin/Zhao forces and Later Liang forces, Wang Chuzhi also contributed an army to fight on the Jin/Zhao side, and together, they crushed the Later Liang forces under Wang Jingren in spring 911. From this point, Chengde and Yiwu were Jin allies, and resumed the use of the Tang Dynasty era name Tianyou (as Jin and its allies ostensibly sought the reestablishment of Tang). After Wang Jingren fled, Li Cunxu gave chase, going as far as briefly putting Wei Prefecture (魏州, in modern Handan, Hebei) under siege, but, concerned that Liu would attack him from the rear, withdrew and returned to Zhao.

Subsequently, Liu, hearing of Later Liang's defeat, was considering claiming imperial title himself.  He sent messengers to Wang Rong and Wang Chuzhi, suggesting that they should honor him as Shangfu (尚父, meaning "imperial father," a highly honorary title that was rarely bestowed and only on highly honored senior officials).  When Wang Rong informed this to Li Cunxu, Li Cunxu, pursuant to suggestions that his generals made that making Liu more arrogant would cause him to push himself into doom, signed a joint declaration with Wang Rong, Wang Chuzhi, as well as three other military governors under Li Cunxu (Li Cunxu's cousin Li Sizhao, Zhou, and Song Yao honoring Liu as Shangfu.  Faced with this, the Later Liang emperor tried to keep Liu at least nominally a vassal by offering him the title of Caifangshi.  Liu thereafter nevertheless declared himself the Emperor of Yan.

In winter 911, Liu attacked Yiwu Circuit. Wang Chuzhi sought aid from Jin.  Li Cunxu sent Zhou to rendezvous with the Zhao officer Wang Deming (Wang Rong's adoptive son) and the Yiwu officer Cheng Yan, to attack Yan.  By late 912, with Li Cunxu himself also sieging Yan's capital You Prefecture, the city fell.  Liu fled but was captured in spring 913, ending Yan.  Li Cunxu took Liu and his father Liu Rengong (whom Liu Shouguang had overthrown and replaced) captive, and was set to return to Taiyuan with them, when both Wang Chuzhi and Wang Rong requested that he took his victory march through Yiwu and Chengde.  Li Cunxu agreed, and when he visited Yiwu, Wang Chuzhi and he went to worship at the temple of Mount Heng together. (After the victory tour, Li Cunxu took Liu Shouguang and Liu Rengong back to Taiyuan and executed them.)  Thereafter, Wang Chuzhi and Wang Rong submitted a joint petition offering the title of Shangshu Ling—which no Tang official had dared to use since the early Tang emperor Emperor Taizong carried that title while he was still the Prince of Qin under his father Emperor Gaozu)—to Li Cunxu. Li Cunxu accepted, and thereafter began to organize a provisional government under Emperor Taizong's precedent.

In 918, Li Cunxu, who had taken Tianxiong Circuit (天雄, headquartered at Wei Prefecture) at that point, prepared a major operation intending to capture Later Liang's capital Daliang. Wang Chuzhi sent some 10,000 soldiers to contribute to Li Cunxu's campaign, which, however, ended with a mutually destructive battle at Huliu Slope (胡柳陂, in modern Heze, Shandong), with both Jin and Later Liang forces suffering two-thirds casualties and Jin forces forced to withdraw.

Overthrow and death 

In 921, Wang Rong was killed in a mutiny, and the mutineers supported Wang Deming to take over Chengde.  Wang Deming accepted and changed his name back to his birth name of Zhang Wenli. Li Cunxu, after initially pretending to accept Zhang's offer of allegiance, declared a general campaign against Zhang to avenge Wang Rong. Wang Chuzhi, however, had misgivings, believing that if Li Cunxu took direct control of Chengde, Yiwu would be taken over as well, and therefore suggested to Li Cunxu that he accept Zhang's submission.  Li Cunxu refused.

Concerned, Wang Chuzhi contacted his son Wang Yu—who was then serving as the military prefect (團練使, Tuanlianshi) of Xin Prefecture (新州, in modern Zhangjiakou, Hebei) under Li Cunxu. He requested that Wang Yu secretly instigate an incursion by Khitan's Emperor Taizu.  Wang Yu agreed, and also requested to be made his heir, and Wang Chuzhi agreed.

However, most of Wang Chuzhi's staff members were apprehensive about inducing a Khitan incursion. Further, Wang Du, who was then Wang Chuzhi's deputy military governor and who was considered his heir, was fearful of being displaced by Wang Yu.  Wang Du and the secretary He Zhaoxun therefore plotted to arrest Wang Chuzhi. They acted after a feast that Wang Chuzhi held for Zhang's emissary to Yiwu, seizing Wang Chuzhi and put him and his wife and concubines under house arrest.  Wang Du thereafter slaughtered all of Wang Chuzhi's male biological descendants at Ding Prefecture, as well as Wang Chuzhi's close associates.  He claimed the title of acting military governor and reported what occurred to Li Cunxu.  Li Cunxu thereafter approved of his takeover from Wang Chuzhi.  (Wang Chuzhi's younger son Wang Wei did escape and flee to Khitan territory, and Wang Wei would subsequently serve under Khitan's Emperor Taizu and his son Emperor Taizong.)

In spring 922, Wang Du visited Wang Chuzhi at his mansion, apparently trying to maintain a pretense of father-son relationship. Wang Chuzhi, though unarmed, hit his chest with a fist and tried to bite off his nose, stating, "Rebellious bandit! When did I ever mistreat you?"  Wang Du barely escaped from Wang Chuzhi's grasp. Shortly after, Wang Chuzhi either died in anger or was killed by Wang Du.

Personal information 
 Father
 Wang Zong
 Children
 Wang Yu
 Wang Wei
 Adoptive Child
 Wang Du, né Liu Yunlang

See also 
 Tomb of Wang Chuzhi

Notes and references 

 Old Book of Tang, vol. 182.
 New History of the Five Dynasties, vol. 39.
 Zizhi Tongjian, vols. 262, 266, 267, 268, 269, 270, 271.

|-

|-

862 births
922 deaths
Politicians from Xi'an
Tang dynasty jiedushi of Yiwu Circuit
Tang dynasty nonimperial princes
Later Liang (Five Dynasties) jiedushi of Yiwu Circuit
Jin (Later Tang precursor) jiedushi of Yiwu Circuit
Five Dynasties and Ten Kingdoms rulers
Tang dynasty generals from Shaanxi
Later Liang (Five Dynasties) people born during Tang
Tang dynasty politicians from Shaanxi